This is a list of United States drone bases, containing military bases from which the United States operates unmanned aerial vehicles.

List

References 

drone bases
Military installations of the United States by country
Unmanned aerial vehicles of the United States
Unmanned aerial vehicles